is a retired Japanese professional shogi player who achieved the rank of 8-dan. He is a former senior managing director of the Japan Shogi Association.

JSA director
Azuma has served on the Japan Shogi Association's board of directors on a number of occasions. He first served as a director from 1995 to 2004, and then as a managing director from 2005 to 2006 and from 2011 to 2017.　

In February 2017, Azuma was one of the two JSA board members to survive a no-confidence vote taken at an emergency meeting of the JSA membership as part of the fallout from  29th Ryūō challenger controversy. The following month he was elevated to senior managing director by the JSA board at a special meeting; he served in that capacity until the end of May 2017, but decided not to submit his name as a candidate for reelection as a board member at the JSA's 68th General Meeting on May 29, 2017.

Promotion history
The promotion history for Azuma is as follows:
 1971: 6-kyū
 1974: 1-dan
 1976, July 16: 4-dan
 1980, April 1: 5-dan
 1984, April 1: 6-dan
 1992, December 18: 7-dan
 2015, April 1: 8-dan
 2021, May 17: Retired

Awards and honors
Azuma received the JSA's "25 Years Service Award" in recognition of being an active professional for twenty-five years in 2001.

References

External links
 ShogiHub: Azuma, Kazuo

Japanese shogi players
Living people
Retired professional shogi players
Professional shogi players from Nagasaki Prefecture
People from Sasebo
1955 births